Joseph-Philias Morin (March 19, 1899 – January 13, 1945) was a politician in Quebec, Canada and a one-term Member of the Legislative Assembly of Quebec (MLA).

Early life

He was born on March 19, 1899, in Saint-Maurice, Mauricie. He made his career in the construction business.

Member of the legislature

Morin served as a Councilmember in Cap-de-la-Madeleine from 1929 to 1933.

Member of the legislature

He won election as a Union Nationale candidate in the district of Champlain in the 1939 provincial election.

He did not run for re-election in 1944, and was succeeded by Maurice Bellemare.

Death

He died on January 13, 1945, in Cap-de-la-Madeleine.

Footnotes

See also
Champlain Provincial Electoral District
Mauricie

1899 births
1945 deaths
People from Mauricie
Union Nationale (Quebec) MNAs